The University of Ferrara is the main university of the city of Ferrara in the Emilia-Romagna region of northern Italy. In the years prior to the First World War the University of Ferrara, with more than 500 students, was the best attended of the free universities in Italy. Today there are approximately 16,000 students enrolled at the University of Ferrara with nearly 400 degrees granted each year. The teaching staff number 600, including 288 researchers. It is organized into 12 Departments.

History 
The University of Ferrara was founded on March 4, 1391 by Marquis Alberto V D'Este with the permission of Pope Boniface IX.  The Studium Generale was inaugurated on St. Luke's Day (October 18) of that year with courses in law, arts and theology. 
After the unification of Italy, Ferrara University became a free university with faculties of Law and Mathematics, a three-year course in Medicine (reduced to two years in 1863-64), as well as Schools of Veterinary Medicine (abolished in 1876), Pharmacy, and for public Notaries.

After World War II, it started to be state-supported and this allowed the opening of many faculties and research departments. The most remarkable growth took place between the '70s and the '80s, when Prof. Antonio Rossi was in charge of it as Rector.

Some notable instructors include:

 Giovanni Bianchini, professor of astronomy
 Cesare Cremonini, professor of natural philosophy between 1573 and 1590

Research and international collaboration 

The CIVR (Comitato di Indirizzo per la Valutazione della Ricerca, or Directory Committee for the Evaluation of Research), according to a public report of 2007, has rated the University of Ferrara as the best Italian university for the applied exploitation of research.  In order to produce these results, the CIVR has taken into consideration numerous data such as patents registered in Italy and abroad, the research collaborations between the university business and academic spin-offs.

Starting in 2000, the University of Ferrara has collaborated across the faculties of economics, architecture, medicine, jurisprudence and engineering in the main industrial areas of China, that is, Guangdong, in research and experimentation with the Chinese universities and important local businesses. Collaborations have begun between the Faculty of Economics of Ferrara and the South China University of Technology, an agreement that has permitted the faculty in Ferrara to undertake a research project about the industry of Guangdong and has allowed the Faculty of Medicine to open in 2006 a permanent office near the Capital University of Medical Sciences of Beijing. This has allowed the implementation of a master's degree of the second level in clinical Neurophysiology, with consent to the young Chinese neurologists, to expand the applied techniques and their studies of neuroscience. Institutions participating in the master’s program include the department of neurophysiology of the University of Ferrara, the Neurological institute of Milan and to Beijing.

Another active master’s program with its seat in Ferrara is that of the aesthetics and cosmetology signed to Canton through the Ferrara Center of Cosmetology and the Chinese academy Ginzza International Beauty and Hair Academy.

Organization 
These are the 8 faculties which the university is divided into:

 Faculty of Architecture
 Faculty of Economics
 Faculty of Engineering
 Faculty of Humanities
 Faculty of Law
 Faculty of Mathematical, Physical and Natural Sciences
 Faculty of Medicine and Surgery
 Faculty of Pharmacy

As of 2014, there are 12 PhD courses, organized around a special Institute for Advanced Studies, IUSS-Ferrara 1391.

Generally speaking, research departments do not coincide with faculties (as is usual in Italy). Specifically, literature, history, philosophy are independent of one another. Furthermore, biologists, physicists, and geologists work in different institutions. Medical research is carried out in cooperation with the city hospital, which offers some of its buildings for use as a teaching hospital.

Famous alumni and professors 

 Ludovico Ariosto
 Patrizio Bianchi
 Nicolaus Copernicus Doctor of Canon Law (Nicolaus Copernich de Prusia, Jure Canonico ... et doctoratus)
 Michele Ferrari
 Theodorus Gaza
 Marcella Hazan
 William Latimer
 Paracelsus
 Massimo Pigliucci
 Girolamo Savonarola

Points of interest
 Biblioteca Comunale Ariostea
 Orto Botanico dell'Università di Ferrara

See also 
 ESDP-Network
 List of Italian universities
 List of medieval universities

References

External links 
 Official website
 Unife on Google+

Ferrara, University of
1391 establishments in Europe
Ferrara, University of
Ferrara, University of
Education in Ferrara
Buildings and structures in Ferrara
Universities and colleges in Emilia-Romagna